Shaare Tefila or Shaarei/Shaarey Tfiloh/Tphiloh ( "Gates of Prayer") may refer to the following synagogues:

Shaaré Tefila Synagogue (Alexandria, Egypt)
Shaarei Tfiloh Synagogue (Baltimore, Maryland, U.S.)
Shaarey Tphiloh (Portland, Maine, U.S.)
Temple Shaaray Tefila (Manhattan, New York, U.S.)